Tiffiny Townend Blacknell (born November 14, 1976) is an American lawyer, community activist, and an advocate for criminal justice reform. Blacknell currently works as a Deputy District Attorney for the Los Angeles County District Attorney. In 2018, Blacknell was featured in Macy's “Find the Remarkable You” campaign which featured six women from different walks of professional life, including Becky Hammon and JoAnn Falletta.

Legal career 
Blacknell currently serves as the Community and Government Affairs Liaison Special Advisor to Los Angeles County District Attorney George Gascón. She previously worked as a Deputy Public Defender in the Los Angeles County Public Defender's Office since 2003 where she handled high-profile cases. In one case, she was assigned to represent a man accused of kidnapping Daisy McCrackin.

Interim public defender appointment 
In 2018, the Los Angeles County Board of Supervisors appointed Nicole Tinkham as interim public defender. Blacknell helped organize an effort to put pressure on the Board of Supervisors to remove Tinkham because of her lack of criminal law experience. Following the protests and public criticism, the Board appointed Ricardo García (attorney) who worked for years in the San Diego County Public Defender's office.

Wiretap scandal 
In July 2018, Blacknell uncovered a secret recording operation inside of an attorney-client interview room. It was later revealed that the operation had been set up by  the Los Angeles Police Department in cooperation with a prosecutor from the Los Angeles County District Attorney's Office. In response to the scandal, the Los Angeles County Board of Supervisors voted to send a letter to then sheriff Jim McDonnell to stop the installation of audio-video recording devices inside of lock-up facilities at various criminal courthouses throughout Los Angeles County. The Los Angeles Times responded to the scandal.

Community activism

Bail reform 
Blacknell has engaged in activism in the Los Angeles community, such as on behalf of the National Black Mama's Bail Out Day campaign. This was a part of the National Bail Out collective, a community-based movement striving to end pretrial detention and mass incarceration. Blacknell believes that the money bail system is unjust and in need of reform. At Community Coalition's People Power Convention, Blacknell said “Ninety-five percent of arrestees plead guilty,” and noted that “studies show that sexual assault and violence happen in the first seven days of an inmate’s incarceration.”

Girls empowerment 
Blacknell was the keynote speaker at the “I Matter: Girls Empowerment Conference” at East Los Angeles College, aiming to create more female leaders in the community. In her speech, Blacknell discussed her journey to become an attorney. She spoke of being a child of the Crack epidemic surrounded by drugs and gangs and having to overcome feelings of self-doubt.

References 

1976 births
People from Inglewood, California
Public defenders
Criminal defense lawyers
USC Gould School of Law alumni
California State University, Dominguez Hills alumni
Lawyers from Los Angeles
Living people
Activists for African-American civil rights
Activists from California
American anti-racism activists